Wiggle Wiggle can refer to:

 "Wiggle Wiggle" (Hello Venus song), 2015
 "Wiggle Wiggle" (Ronnie Sessions song), 1977
"Don't Stop (Wiggle Wiggle)", by the Outhere Brothers, 1994
Wiggle Wiggle and Other Exercises, an album of children's songs by Bobby Susser
 "Wiggle Wiggle", Bob Dylan song from Under the Red Sky

See also
Wiggle (disambiguation)